Mordellistena meuseli is a species of beetle in the family Mordellidae which is in the superfamily Tenebrionoidea. It was discovered in 1956 and can be found in Austria, Czech Republic, France, Germany, Hungary, Slovakia and Ukraine.

References

meuseli
Beetles described in 1956
Beetles of Europe